The Republican Union Party (PUR), commonly known as the Republican Union or the Unionist Party, was a political party in Portugal.

History
The party was established on 24 February 1912 as the result of a split in the National Republican Union (UNR), with one faction breaking away to form the Evolutionist Party and the rump of the UNR becoming the Republican Union. It won 15 seats in the House of Representatives and 11 seats in the Senate in the 1915 parliamentary elections, emerging as the third-largest faction after the Democratic Party.

The party boycotted the 1918 elections, but returned to run in the 1919 elections, in which it won 17 House seats, regaining its place as the third-largest party.

In 1919 the party merged with the Evolutionist Party to form the Republican Liberal Party.

References

Defunct political parties in Portugal
Conservative parties in Portugal
Liberal parties in Portugal
Political parties established in 1912
1912 establishments in Portugal
Political parties disestablished in 1919
1919 disestablishments in Portugal